The Nokia 1 Plus (also known as Nokia 1.1) is a Nokia-branded budget Android Go smartphone launched in 2019 as the successor to the Nokia 1.

Specifications 
The Nokia 1 Plus runs the Android Go edition of Android Pie. It has a MediaTek MT6739WW System-on-chip with 1 GB of RAM and 8 GB internal memory. The device has a 5MP front camera and an 8MP rear camera with a flash.

Reception 
The Nokia 1 Plus received mixed to positive reviews, with David Lumb of TechRadar praising the device's "decent specs for the price and durable removable cover" while criticising the "poor performance and storage".

References

External links
 Nokia 1 Plus official homepage

1 Plus
Mobile phones introduced in 2019
Mobile phones with user-replaceable battery